NClass is a free and open source software tool to create Unified Modeling Language (UML) class diagrams for C# and Java applications. It is written in C# only and needs the .NET Framework 4.0 or the latest version of Mono.

Features 
NClass supports only class diagram of the standard UML diagram types.

The user interface is designed to be simple and user friendly, and the visualization of diagrams is configurable via a style system. NClass can generate source code from the model or reverse engineer .NET assemblies by a plugin written by Malte Ried. It can also export to many image formats like JPEG, Portable Network Graphics (PNG), or Windows Metafile.

Future development 
NClass is missing several major features like undo or round-trip engineering which are frequently requested. These features are planned to be implemented in long-term development.

References

External links 

.NET programming tools